Stepan Yelizarovich Artyomenko (22 January [O.S. 9 January] 1913 – 5 May 1977) was the commander of a battalion of the 447th Rifle Regiment in the Red Army during the Second World War, who was twice awarded the title Hero of the Soviet Union.

Early life
(now located in the Ivanivka Raion of present-day Ukraine.) Having completed schooling in 1927, he entered the Red Army in 1935 and later worked for the NKVD.

World War II
Not long after the German invasion of the Soviet Union, Artyomenko was deployed to the warfront in August 1941 as an ordinary soldier.  During the fighting around Kharkov, he replaced his platoon commander who was unable to fight, and for several days led a defended his sector, not letting the enemy pass through. On one occasion near Izyum-Barvenkovskom he commanded a company of machine gunners that were part of a tank brigade. He went on to fight in the Battle of Stalingrad and the Kursk Bulge.

Upon breaking though enemy defenses on the western bank of the Vistula in January 1945, Artyomenko's battalion captured two rows of enemy trenches, and then with the help of tank crews, made their way to the Polish city of Sochaczew where they attacked an enemy garrison there.

He was awarded his first gold star on 27 February 1945 for successfully leading his battalion through Warsaw and throughout Poland. During the Battle of Berlin he was seriously wounded during the close-quarters fighting. After the surrender of Nazi Germany he was awarded the title Hero of the Soviet Union again on 31 May 1945 for his actions in the crossing of the Oder River and Berlin.

Postwar
After the end of the war he remained in the Red Army, and from 1946 to 1948 he attended an officer improvement school. When he retired in 1955, he was the commissar of the military enlistment office in Odessa. After his death on 5 May 1977 he was buried in Odessa at the 2nd Christian cemetery.

References

External links 
 

1913 births
1977 deaths
People from Odesa Oblast
People from Odessky Uyezd
Soviet colonels
Soviet military personnel of World War II from Ukraine
Heroes of the Soviet Union
Recipients of the Order of Lenin
Recipients of the Order of the Red Banner
Recipients of the Order of Alexander Nevsky
Recipients of the Medal "For Courage" (Russia)
Recipients of the Order of the Red Star